Nayler could refer to:

Erin Nayler (born 1992), New Zealand association footballer
George Nayler (1764-1831), English officer at arms
James Nayler (1618-1660), English Quaker leader
Maria Nayler (born 1982), British singer